Route 329 is a collector road in the Canadian province of Nova Scotia.

It is located in Lunenburg County and connects East River at Trunk 3 with Hubbards at Trunk 3.

It runs around the perimeter of the Aspotogan Peninsula.

Communities
East River
East River Point
Deep Cove
Upper Blandford
Blandford
Bayswater
Aspotogan
Northwest Cove
The Lodge
Birchy Head
Fox Point
Hubbards

Parks
Swissair 111 Memorial
Bayswater Beach Provincial Park
East River Provincial Park

See also
List of Nova Scotia provincial highways

References

Nova Scotia provincial highways
Roads in Lunenburg County, Nova Scotia